The Universal Life Church (or ULC) is a religious organization that offers anyone semi-immediate ordination as a ULC minister free of charge. The organization states that anyone can become a minister immediately, without having to go through the pre-ordination process required by other religious faiths. The ordination application, however, must be checked by a human in order to be official; therefore, true ordination usually takes a few days. The ULC's ordinations are issued in the belief that all people are already ordained by God and that the ULC is merely recognizing this fact.

The following is a list of notable people who have been ordained as ministers in the Universal Life Church.

A

B

C

D

E

F

G

H

J

K

L

M

N

O

P

R

S

T

V

W

References

Ministers
Universal Life Church